Ezenwa Otorogu  (born 13 May 1987, in Owerri) is a Nigerian footballer who plays for Hapoel Ashkelon in the Israeli second division.

Club career 
Tall striker who has been among Enyimba’s goal scorers this season 2008 with 15 goals in the league and 5 in the CAF Champions League.

He was courted by South African giants Ajax Cape Town, Denmark's Aalborg and Sudan club Al-Hilal (Omdurman), although the fee between the clubs has not been confirmed. He instead moved on 30 December 2008 to Club Africain, signing a contract until June 2011.

International career 
He played with Nigeria at the 2006 FIFA Beach Soccer World Cup in Brazil, he played 3 games.

Honours 
Nigerian Premier League (1): 
2007
MTN 8 (1):
2010
Premier Soccer League (1): 
2010-11
2008: Nigerian Premier League Top scorer with 15 goals

References

1987 births
Living people
People from Owerri
Nigerian footballers
Enyimba F.C. players
Association football forwards
Nigerian expatriate sportspeople in Tunisia
El-Kanemi Warriors F.C. players
Orlando Pirates F.C. players
Bloemfontein Celtic F.C. players
Hakoah Maccabi Amidar Ramat Gan F.C. players
Hapoel Ashkelon F.C. players
Liga Leumit players
Sportspeople from Imo State